Mattia Bani (born 10 December 1993) is an Italian professional footballer who plays as a centre-back for  club Genoa.

Club career
Born in Borgo San Lorenzo, Tuscany, Bani started his career at Ligurian club Genoa's under-20 team, which plays in Campionato Nazionale Primavera.

Reggiana
On 9 July 2012, Bani signed for Reggiana in a co-ownership deal for a peppercorn of €500. On 20 June 2013, Reggiana acquired Bani outright for free.

Pro Vercelli
On 3 July 2013, Bani joined Pro Vercelli in another co-ownership deal. In June 2014 the co-ownership of Bani and Ardizzone were renewed.

On 25 June 2015, Vercelli acquired the remaining 50% registration rights of Bani.

Chievo
On 28 July 2016, Bani moved to Serie A club Chievo from Pro Vercelli for €4 million transfer fee; at the same time Chievo sold goalkeeper Simone Moschin to Vercelli also for €4 million fee. Bani was immediately returned to Vercelli on a temporary deal.

Bani formally became part of the squad of Chievo in 2017–18 Serie A pre-season. He made his club debut in competitive match in the Italian cup; on 5 January 2018 Bani made his Serie A debut against Udinese.

Bologna
On 22 June 2019, Bani signed with Bologna.

Genoa
On 5 October 2020, he joined Genoa on a season-long loan with an obligation to buy.

Parma
On 1 February 2021, Bani joined Parma on loan with an option to buy until 30 June 2021.

Career statistics

References

External links
 AIC profile (data by football.it) 
 

Living people
1993 births
People from Borgo San Lorenzo
Sportspeople from the Metropolitan City of Florence
Association football defenders
Italian footballers
Genoa C.F.C. players
A.C. Reggiana 1919 players
F.C. Pro Vercelli 1892 players
A.C. ChievoVerona players
Bologna F.C. 1909 players
Parma Calcio 1913 players
Serie A players
Serie B players
Serie C players
Footballers from Tuscany